Nina Ivanišin is a Slovenian film and theatre actress. She was born in 1985 in Maribor, Slovenia. She graduated from Ljubljana Film and Theatre Academy (AGRFT).

Ivanišin has starred in several Slovenian and foreign movies and is a member of Ljubljana Slovene National Theatre Drama. She has won several awards vor her performances, including best actress at the Slovenia Film Festival (2010, for Piran-Pirano), and at the Girona Film Festival (2012, for Slovenian Girl).

In 2017 to 2019, she appeared in 10 episodes of the TV series "V Dvoje".

She is married to Klemen Janežič.

Filmography

Film

TV Series

Awards

References

External links

Living people
1985 births
21st-century Slovenian actresses
University of Ljubljana alumni
Actors from Maribor
Slovenian film actresses
Slovenian stage actresses